Mingur is one of the villages situated in Kalampur block of Kalahandi district in the State of Odisha in India.

Villages in Kalahandi district